The Praga Grand was a luxury automobile manufactured by Praga in Libeň, Prague. Production of the first Grand, equipped with a four-cylinder engine, started in the Kingdom of Bohemia in 1912 and continued after the dissolution of Austro-Hungary in the First Czechoslovak Republic. It was used by the Austro-Hungarian Army during World War I as a staff car. The Praga Grand 8 introduced in 1927 had an eight-cylinder engine and was the official state car for the Czechoslovak president Tomáš Garrigue Masaryk. The car also achieved limited success in road racing.

Development

The Grand was the second car produced by Praga, and was designed by chief designer František Kec to be a more luxurious complement to the Mignon. The design was typical of its period, with a separate rectangular frame chassis to which different bodies could be fitted. The engine had four cylinders, displaced , produced  and was equipped with an electric starter. This engine was also used in the first tractors produced by Praga.

In September 1927, the design was upgraded. A new engine was fitted which had eight cylinders to give a smoother and calmer ride alongside more power, with  available. Features included a dashboard-mounted speedometer with trip meter, clock and fuel gauge, electric indicators and hydraulic brakes.

Further development of the vehicle design took place during the ensuing years. The new model was known as the 17/60 HP. At the same time, the company introduced the first seven seater body.

1935 saw the ultimate development of the vehicle for luxury use. The standard vehicle by that time had a chassis with a  wheelbase and was powered by a  engine. A mere handful of these were produced.

Service

The car proved itself early on, when three prototypes entered in an alpine race in 1912 achieved the top three places. After this, orders from the Austro-Hungarian Army were assured, and the car served as a staff car and ambulance in the force throughout World War I. 335 were produced before the end of the war and, at the end of the conflict, manufacturing resumed in 1919. Nearly four hundred more were sold between 1919 and 1926. They saw some success in post-war Alpine races.

With the creation of Czechoslovakia after the war, the Grand was the vehicle of choice for the new president, Tomáš Garrigue Masaryk. The Grand was popular with the rich, and it had a price tag to match. According to the 1925 price list, a basic vehicle cost 89,000 CSK, with an open-top phaeton priced at 115,000 CSK and the limousine 135,000 CSK.

With the introduction of the eight-cylinder engine in 1927, the car gained even more prestige and was termed the Rolls-Royce of Czechoslovakia. The car was particularly well received after its 1931 update, with motoring journalist Denik Národní calling it the favoured vehicle of the Czechoslovak elite (""). The last example to be used as a presidential carriage was a 1935 limousine presented to Masaryk by his successor Edvard Beneš.

Production
A total of 1,196 vehicles were produced, of which 897 had four-cylinder engines, with 299, the later model, with an eight-cylinder engine. The car was also produced in small numbers under license by Magyar Wagon in Hungary as the Rába Grand, both before and after World War I. The chassis was also used as the basis for fire engines and ambulances for civil and military service.

References

Citations

Bibliography

Cars introduced in 1912
Cars of the Czech Republic
Praga vehicles